Jhojan Esmaides Julio Palacios (born 11 February 1998) is an Ecuadorian footballer who plays for LDU Quito. Mainly an attacking midfielder, he can also play as a winger.

Club career

LDU Quito
Born in Quito, Julio joined LDU Quito's youth setup in September 2010, aged 12. After impressing with the under-18 squad, he made his first team – and Serie A – debut on 25 June 2016, starting in a 0–0 away draw against Universidad Católica del Ecuador.

Julio scored his first senior goals on 22 October 2017, netting a brace in a 5–2 home success over Delfín. He established himself as a regular starter from the 2018 season onwards, and renewed his contract until 2022 on 4 April of that year.

On 14 September 2020, Julio further extended his contract with LDU until 2024. In September 2021, he was suspended for two months after an altercation with Emelec players during a match between both clubs, but the ban was later reduced to two matches on 1 October.

Loan to Santos
On 30 March 2022, LDU announced the transfer of Julio to Brazilian club Santos on a 14-month loan deal, with a buyout clause. Santos officially announced the move the following day.

Julio made his debut for Peixe on 9 April 2022, starting in a 0–0 away draw against Fluminense. On 17 December, Santos announced that his loan was cut short.

International career
On 12 March 2019, Julio was called up by manager Jorge Célico to the Ecuador national team for friendlies against United States and Honduras. He made his full international debut nine days later, coming on as a second-half substitute for Renato Ibarra in a 0–1 loss against the former at the Exploria Stadium in Orlando, Florida.

In December 2019, Julio was called up to the under-23 team for the 2020 CONMEBOL Pre-Olympic Tournament, but had to withdraw due to an injury.

Personal life
Julio's half-brothers Anderson and Madison are also footballers. Both play as a winger.

Career statistics

Club

International

Honours
LDU Quito
Ecuadorian Serie A: 2018
Copa Ecuador: 2019
Supercopa Ecuador: 2020, 2021

References

1998 births
Living people
Footballers from Quito
Association football midfielders
Ecuadorian footballers
Ecuadorian Serie A players
Campeonato Brasileiro Série A players
L.D.U. Quito footballers
Santos FC players
Ecuador international footballers
Ecuadorian expatriate footballers
Ecuadorian expatriate sportspeople in Brazil
Expatriate footballers in Brazil